Quercus setulosa is the accepted name of an oak species in genus Quercus of the family Fagaceae. It is now placed in section Ilex of subgenus Cerris.

Subspecies and Description 
The Catalogue of Life lists the following:
 Q. setulosa laotica
 Q. setulosa setulosa

This oak tree grows up to 30 m tall and has been recorded from Laos and Vietnam (especially the Central Highlands), where it may be called sồi duối.

References

External links
 
 

setulosa
Flora of Indo-China
Trees of Vietnam
Taxa named by Aimée Antoinette Camus